Lawrence Joseph Hogan Sr. (September 30, 1928 – April 20, 2017) was an American politician who served as a Republican U.S. Congressman, representing the 5th congressional district of Maryland from January 3, 1969, to January 3, 1975. In 1974, he was the only Republican Representative to vote to recommend all three House articles of impeachment against President Richard Nixon. He was the father of the 62nd Governor of Maryland, Larry Hogan.

Hogan did not run for re-election in 1974 and was unsuccessful that year in his candidacy for the Republican nomination for governor. He became county executive for Prince George's County, Maryland, in 1978 and served until 1982.

To date, he is the last Republican to have served as representative from Maryland's 5th congressional district.

Early life and education
Born in Boston, on September 30, 1928, Hogan was raised in Washington, D.C. and attended Gonzaga College High School. He received his bachelor's degree from Georgetown University in 1949, J.D. from Georgetown in 1954, and was admitted to the Bar in the same year. While a college student, he worked for the Washington Times-Herald. He joined the FBI in 1948 and became a full-time agent while attending law school. He later was enrolled in graduate studies at San Francisco State College, 1956–1957, received a master's degree from American University in 1965, and continued studies at the University of Maryland, 1966–1967.

Career
Hogan's private career included practicing law and public relations. His Larry Hogan Associates business was making $1 million a year before he sold it to enter politics.

In 1968, Hogan won against incumbent Hervey Machen to represent Maryland's 5th congressional district, and was re-elected in 1970 and 1972. Hogan was the only Republican on the House Judiciary Committee to vote for all three articles of impeachment against Richard Nixon when they were adopted in committee during the impeachment process against Nixon. Hogan pointedly said during the televised committee hearings:

Hogan entered Maryland's 1974 gubernatorial race when polls showed him a strong challenger to incumbent Governor Marvin Mandel. Hogan's abandonment of Nixon, however, contributed to his loss in the Republican primary to Louise Gore, who in turn lost to Mandel. Political observers also attributed Hogan's loss to Gore's "genteel, low-key nature". Gladys Spellman was elected to take Hogan's former seat in Congress.

After his 1974 defeat, Hogan and his wife Ilona opened the law firm Hogan and Hogan, with offices in Forestville, Maryland, and Washington, D.C. In 1976, Hogan was elected a Maryland National Republican Committeeman, and in January 1977 he began working as executive vice-president of the Associated Builders and Contractors trade association. When he left the position to re-enter politics, he was being paid between $70,000 and $100,000 a year, .

In 1978, Hogan challenged incumbent Prince George's County Executive Win Kelly amid a 'tax revolt' and won the office with 60% of the vote. County voters passed a tax reform measure known as "TRIM" that same year.

Hogan challenged first-term Democratic Senator Paul Sarbanes (who was his House Judiciary Committee colleague during the Nixon impeachment) in 1982 and lost heavily. Parris Glendening was elected as county executive in his place, and Hogan's political career was over. He returned to practicing law, taught, and wrote books. His Legal Aspects of the Fire Service is used at training academies across the U.S. as of 2014.

Personal life and death
Hogan married Ilona Maria Modly in 1974 after his first marriage to Nora Maguire ended with divorce in 1972 after 27 years. Ilona was elected to the Board of County Commissioners in Frederick County after they moved there. Two of Hogan's six children are also politically involved in the state of Maryland. Patrick N. Hogan was formerly a Republican Delegate representing Maryland's District 3A. Hogan's eldest son, Larry Hogan, was the Governor of Maryland from January 2015 to January 2023 after winning the 2014 and 2018 elections.

On April 15, 2017, Hogan had a severe stroke and died five days later, on April 20, at a hospital in Annapolis, Maryland, aged 88.

References

External links

Hogan's Maryland Archives biography
Lawrence Joseph Hogan papers

Larry Hogan Sr. Speaks about his decision on the Nixon Impeachment Vimeo

|-

|-

1928 births
2017 deaths
20th-century American lawyers
20th-century American male writers
20th-century American non-fiction writers
20th-century American politicians
21st-century American lawyers
American University alumni
American male non-fiction writers
Candidates in the 1982 United States elections
Federal Bureau of Investigation agents
Georgetown University Law Center alumni
Gonzaga College High School alumni
Lawyers from Washington, D.C.
Maryland lawyers
Neurological disease deaths in Maryland
Politicians from Boston
Prince George's County, Maryland Executives
Republican Party members of the United States House of Representatives from Maryland
San Francisco State University alumni
University of Maryland, College Park alumni
Writers from Maryland
Writers from Massachusetts